Oleh Shevchenko (born 23 April 1988) is a Ukrainian professional football goalkeeper who played for Desna Chernihiv.

Career
Oleg Shevchenko having started his career with Slavutych, the first coach was Salei Oleksandr Mikhailovich. In 2008 he moved to Yednist Plysky, where he stayed until 2013 and he played 35 matches. In 2009 he played for Yednist Plysky 2 and he won the  Ukrainian Football Amateur League. In the 2009–10 season, he took part in the team of Yednist Plysky getting into the 1/8 round of the Ukrainian Cup against Shakhtar Donetsk. In the 2010/2011 seasons, he played for the amateur football club Yednist Plysky 2 at the Chernihiv Oblast Football Cup. In 2013 he moved to Desna Chernihiv, the main club of the city of Chernihiv, here he played until the end of 2017. In 2018 he moved to Polissya Zhytomyr in Ukrainian Second League.

Honours
Desna Chernihiv
 Ukrainian First League: 2017–18
 Ukrainian First League: Runner-Up 2016–17

Yednist Plysky 2
 Ukrainian Football Amateur League: 2009 
 Ukrainian Football Amateur League: Runner-Up 2007

Gallery

References

External links
 Oleh Shevchenko at pfl.ua 
 

1988 births
Living people
Ukrainian footballers
Association football goalkeepers
Ukrainian expatriate footballers
FC Slavutych players
FC Yednist Plysky players
FC Polissya Zhytomyr players
FC Desna Chernihiv players